Duan Ju  (Chinese: 段举; born 31 August 1963) is a Chinese football midfielder who played for China in the 1988 Asian Cup.

Playing career
Duan Ju was born in Tianjin. At the age of 17, he was called up to China youth football team. Duan Ju played for Tianjin football Team 2 from 1980 to 1983. From 1984 to 1991, Duan Ju played for Tianjin. In 1988, Duan Ju played for China  in the 1988 Asian Cup and football match at the 1988 Olympic Games. In 1990, China lost to Thailand in football match at the 1990 Asian Games. The coach of China, Gao Fengwen quit office， then Duan Ju quit the China national team and returned to Tianjin. in 1992, Duan Ju had gone to Japan and played for NKK SC. In 1993, Duan Ju retired in Japan and returned to China. In 1995, Duan Ju played for Tianjin Yuancheng football club, in the same year， Duan Ju retired again.

Career statistics

International statistics

External links
Team China Stats

1963 births
Chinese footballers
Living people
Footballers at the 1986 Asian Games
Olympic footballers of China
Footballers at the 1988 Summer Olympics
China international footballers
Footballers at the 1990 Asian Games
Association football midfielders
Asian Games competitors for China